Bewerley is a village and civil parish in the Harrogate district of North Yorkshire, England, about twelve miles west of Ripon.  The parish includes the urban area of Pateley Bridge west of the River Nidd (known as Bridgehouse Gate), and the village of Greenhow, as well as Bewerley village.  According to the 2001 census the parish had a population of 730, decreasing at the 2011 Census to 717.

History 
Bewerley is mentioned in the Domesday Book (as Burelei).   Before the Norman Conquest it was part of the estates of Gospatric, Earl of Northumbria.  After the conquest the estates passed to the Mowbray family and in 1175 Roger de Mowbray sold the Bewerley estate to Fountains Abbey, which established a grange at Bewerley. After the Dissolution the ownership of Bewerley was fragmented.  In 1674 the manor of Bewerley, together with some land, was acquired by the Yorke family, which held it until 1924.

By the 19th century Bewerley was a township in the large parish of Ripon.  It became a separate civil parish in 1866.

Buildings 
Bewerley Hall was built in the 16th or 17th century.  In 1774 it was acquired by the Yorke family, who built a new hall in 1815.  The new hall was demolished in 1925, but the old hall survives.

Bewerley Park Centre for Outdoor Education is run by the North Yorkshire County Council.

Bewerley Grange Chapel was built by Marmaduke Huby, abbot of Fountains Abbey from 1495 to 1526.  After the Dissolution the chapel was used as a dwelling house, and from 1678 to 1831 as a school.  In 1965 it was restored and returned to use as a chapel.

References

Further reading

External links

 Bewerley Parish Council
 Bewerley Grange Chapel Website
 Bewerley Park Outdoor Pursuits Centre

Villages in North Yorkshire
Civil parishes in North Yorkshire
Pateley Bridge